Worcester is a census-designated place (CDP) forming the central settlement of the town of Worcester in Otsego County, New York, United States. The population of the CDP was 986 at the 2020 census.

Geography
Worcester is located at  (42.59172, -74.75050), along New York State Route 7.

Demographics

References

Census-designated places in New York (state)
Census-designated places in Otsego County, New York